Chokio-Alberta High School is a public high school with students in grades seven through twelve, located in Chokio, Minnesota, United States. It was formerly two schools, the elementary school being located in Chokio and the High School being located in Alberta. The school's mascot is the Spartans, though Chokio-Alberta combines with Morris Area High School as the MACA Tigers.

References

External links

Public high schools in Minnesota
Educational institutions established in 1967
Schools in Stevens County, Minnesota
1967 establishments in Minnesota